The City of Charleston Police Department (CPD) is the official police force of Charleston, South Carolina. It is one of South Carolina's largest municipal agencies, alongside the South Carolina Highway Patrol. There are 458 sworn officers, 117 civilians, and several reserve police officers. In July 2011, the department was re-accredited through 2014 with the Accreditation with Excellence Award by the Commission on Accreditation for Law Enforcement Agencies (CALEA).  Replacing the former "Flagship Award," the Accreditation with Excellence Award is the highest single-period accreditation award available. The department also received the Meritorious Accreditation Award in 2011, representing at least 15 continuous years of CALEA accreditation.

History 

In the early colonial period, police protection for the citizens of Charleston was performed by the Town Watch, a paramilitary unit. After incorporation in 1783, Charleston formally established the City Guard, another paramilitary force. The City Guard helped suppress the 1822 Vesey slave rebellion. From 1846 to 1855, the City Guard was reorganized several times and finally emerged in 1856 as a uniformed police force under the administration of Mayor William Porcher Miles.

The Guard was armed with swords and pistols. It enforced a nine o'clock curfew for African-American residents of the city. Based at the "Guard House" at the corner of Broad and Meeting Streets, the force flogged those out after hours.

Prior to the close of the Civil War, martial law was enacted in Charleston, and the city police force disbanded. Civil police forces were revived and reorganized, however, in 1865 following the election of P. C. Gaillard. These forces served as a counterpoint to the federal authorities until the end of martial law in 1877.

The election of Mayor W. W. Sale that same year marked the introduction of a city police organizational system of officers and men, divided between the main station and the upper station, a system that was continued by succeeding administrations.

On 7 February 1888 a new station was opened at the corner of southeast King and Hutson Streets. 
In 1895 the State of South Carolina authorities established a metropolitan police and seized control of the organization from January 1896 to 30 September 1897, at which time control was returned to the city. 
In 1907 a large, modern facility was erected at the northwest corner of Vanderhorst and St. Philip Streets. The police department remained at this location until 1974, at which time they moved to their current location on Lockwood Boulevard.

According to police, on December 29, 2020, 911 operators received a call at 3:06 a.m. which was followed by a second call minutes later regarding a disturbance and domestic violence incident that was occurring at the Bridge View Apartment complex located at 105 N. Romney Street. “CPD officers were dispatched and, upon arrival, shots were exchanged between an individual and the officers,” police said. The individual was 28 year old Charleston native Jason LaTroy "Tank" Cooper A report states one officer was shot in the chest but sustained non-life-threatening injuries as the officer was a wearing a ballistic vest. Investigators said the suspect Jason Cooper was also shot during the incident and later died as a result of the shooting.

On January 19, 2021,  Police say a man by the name of Montrez Cyrus Simmons of North Charleston South Carolina was wanted for multiple violent crimes in the Lowcountry including murder and carjackings has been arrested following a chase in the Charleston area which led to the suspect getting shot in an officer-involved shooting. Charleston Police Chief Luther Reynolds said the man, who has not been identified, is wanted for various crimes including a recent murder in Georgetown, a carjacking in Mount Pleasant that happened on Monday and an armed carjacking that happened earlier this evening in Charleston. Officers located the carjacked vehicle and the suspect Tuesday night, and a short chase ensued which ended in the area of Spruill Avenue and Comstock Avenue.According to Reynolds, at the end of the pursuit, shots were fired and the suspect was transported to a hospital for injuries from a gunshot wound. Reynolds said a gun belonging to the suspect was located and recovered from the scene. Reynolds stressed that it was the second time in weeks that his officers had encountered a violent suspect with a criminal background who was armed. “I want to make this clear. This is important to me to say this publicly. This is the second time my officers in a matter of weeks have encountered a violent suspect with a career violent criminal record who was armed,” he said. “Let me say that again. This is the second time in a matter of weeks that my officers have encountered a violent armed criminal offender. We have a serious violent crime problem.” The police chief said everyone must continue to work together to help address these crime issues. “I am proud of and thankful that we have police officers throughout this region, not just in the city of Charleston,” he said. “Throughout this region, throughout this country that are putting their lives on the line to keep our city safe. They're selfless and they're fighting for others and protecting our citizens who can't fight for themselves.” Reynolds said he was pleased to say no more citizens were injured and officers were okay following the Tuesday night incident. “They're safe because this could have had a very different conclusion,” he said.”This is the second time that we’ve all stood here for a similar related event.” State troopers and SLED agents also responded to the scene. Earlier tonight, viewers reported law enforcement units chasing a car followed by a wreck in a yard. One viewer who captured video of the incident said that someone appeared to be on the ground following the chase with law enforcement units directing traffic away from the scene.

On March 10, 2021, officers were notified of a man walking around the Colonial Grand at Cypress Cove apartment complex with a semi-automatic rifle around 11:00 a.m.  Neighbors reported that the man was harassing them and trying to get into their home.  “He’s standing outside our apartment he’s actually across from us and he is waving a big gun. It looks like a AK-47 of some sort and I do not feel safe,” says a 911 caller. The suspect, who was later identified as George Grayson Sanner (25), barricaded himself inside his apartment when police arrived. After an hour of waiting, Sanner walked out onto his balcony and shot towards an officer. The officer returned fire and Sanner was hit, then taken to the hospital. Ninth Circuit Solicitor Scarlett Wilson declined to bring charges against the officer who shot Sanner, noting that Sanner was armed and dangerous and shooting at officers.

Units

The department's operational units include the following:
Uniform Patrol Division
Homicide investigations
Special Victims Unit
Central Investigations Division
Traffic Unit
Harbor Patrol
Canine Unit
Special-Event Units, including the Special Weapons and Tactics (SWAT) Team, the Crisis Negotiation Team, the Explosive Devices Team, the Underwater Recovery Team, the Civil Disturbance Unit, the Disaster Response Team, and the Honor Guard
Forensics Services Division, including the Crime Scene Unit, a Fingerprint Lab, a Crime Lab, a Photo Lab, a Digital Evidence Unit, and a Polygraph Examiner
Computer Crime Unit
Victims Services Unit
Animal Services
Motor  Bike Unit
Community Actions Team to help bond with the public
Community Services Officer (CSO) Unit, composed of uniformed volunteers who assist the department with various non-enforcement duties, but is slowly falling apart with outdated and old vehicles, also lack of response from administration.

The department manages and maintains its own fleet of vehicles, with ASE-certified mechanics operating an on-site garage.  The department also operates a radio shop that programs and maintains the department's radio network and emergency vehicle equipment.

Vehicles

The Charleston Police Department's primary vehicle is the Taurus-based Ford Police Interceptor.  The marked patrol fleet did away with the police version of the Dodge Charger (LX) due to the no chase policy. All of the lights on all vehicles are blue lights only. CPD does not use red and blue lights for its units.  The Traffic unit uses Ford primarily Interceptors as well as Ford Mustangs and Harley-Davidson Electra Glide motorcycles. Black, blue and white is traditional in this department. CPD also uses ford explorers into their department but these are primarily used for school resource officers, sergeants and new hire officers at times.

The department employs a wide variety of unmarked vehicles for officers assigned to administrative, investigative, patrol, special operations, and undercover assignments. Vehicles used are a mixture of Chevrolet Tahoes, Ford Crown Victorias, Ford 350's, Ford Explorers, Chevy Impalas, and Ford Fusions.

Units serving in the peninsula of Charleston also use primarily the Trek police mountain bikes but they also have T3 Motion electric vehicles, and Segway personal transporters.

Buildings

The Charleston Police Department has several stations.

 Chief John Conroy Law Enforcement Center - CPD's headquarters and the Communications Center for several city Emergency Services, excluding the Charleston Fire Department (CFD). The Chief Reuben M. Greenberg Municipal Complex, located adjacent to the Chief Conroy building, houses the city's courthouse, the Municipal Court operations offices, the Department of Traffic and Transportation, and a Department of Motor Vehicles office.
Team 1 Office on Meeting Street
Team 2/ Team 9 Office on George Street
Team 3 Office on Wappoo Creek Drive
Johns Island Office at the CFD station on Bohicket Road
Team 4 Office on Mary Ader Ave.
Team 5 Office at the CFD station on Seven Farms Drive
Team 7 Office (Traffic Division) on Brigade Street
Crime Prevention Office in the Citadel Mall on Sam Rittenberg Boulevard
Numerous other facilities and offices throughout the community

The headquarters building is the only CPD facility that is staffed 24 hours per day; all others serve as substations and/or business offices.

The Charleston Police Department also has authority over the:

Temporary Holding Facility (the modern City Jail was closed in 2007)
Police memorial at Brittlebank Park (across Lockwood Boulevard from the Chief Greenberg Complex)

Rank structure

All officers have to complete 2 years of probation to become a police officer. The rank goes from PPO(probationary police officer) to PO(police officer). Officers can begin receiving overtime once they are out of their training phase. Officers cannot do off duty work until they are out of their PTO for at least 6 months.  Charleston Police Department chevrons are royal blue on a black background.  Non-commissioned officers also wear one royal blue-on-black hash mark on their lower left sleeves for every four years of service to the department.

The design of an officer's badge also changes by rank. Officer to Master Police Officer includes an all silver badge. Sergeant included a silver badge with a colored inside.  Lieutenant Includes an all gold badge. Captain to Chief of Police includes an all gold badge with colored inside. Detectives as well have gold and colored in badges. Also  Lieutenant to Chief of Police have dark striped pants when Sergeant to Officer has royal blue striped pants.

The titles "Detective" and "Investigator" are based on assignment only.  Detectives are assigned to the Central Investigations Division and wear gold badges.  Investigators are officers whose primary responsibilities include the investigation of criminal offenses, but who are not assigned to Central.

The position of Patrol Training Officer, or PTO, is bestowed upon experienced officers in the Uniform Patrol Division whose responsibilities include the training and evaluation of new officers upon their graduation from the South Carolina Criminal Justice Academy.  The PTO designation is displayed on a pin worn above the officer's name tag.  The position of PTO was formerly known as Field Training Officer, or FTO.

The Charleston Police Department is currently changing how these ranks are formed. Officers who are up for master police officer and sergeant can take exams for both. Officers have the chance to become either, however, sergeant still hold more rank in the command staff.

Departmental teams 
Each area of responsibility has a team assigned within the department. The locations are the physical substations of the teams and are not staffed 24/7. Team 1,2,3,4,5 and 9 are the basic patrol teams.

-Patrol Team One serves the area of the Peninsula City on a line north of Calhoun Street to the North Charleston city line between the Cooper River and the Ashley River.

-Patrol Team Two serves the area of the Peninsula City on a line south of Calhoun Street between the Cooper River and the Ashley River. Team Two also serves Fort Sumter in Charleston Harbor.

-Patrol Team Three serves major portions of James Island and some areas of Johns Island, including the Charleston Executive Airport.

-Patrol Team Four serves major portions of the St. Andrews / West Ashley areas of the city and extends from the Intracoastal Waterway on Charleston Harbor to Magnolia Gardens on State Highway 61 and on Main Road and U.S. Highway 17, between the Ashley River and the Stono River to Rantowles Creek.

-Patrol Team Five was established in January 2002 and serves Daniel Island, Thomas Island, Rodden Island, and portions of Clements Ferry Road (Highway 33), Cainhoy Road (Highway 98), and areas adjacent to Highway 41. The team also patrols approximately five square miles within the Francis Marion Forest, bordered by the Wando River in Berkeley County.

-Team Six is the team that consists of School Resource Officers and the School Security Response Team (SSRT).

-Team Seven also known as "The Special Units Team" consists of the Traffic Division (This team handles all traffic enforcement throughout the city with the ultimate goal of accident reduction and pedestrian safety. This Team also includes Transport officers and Harbor Patrol. Parking enforcement is no longer a part of Traffic Division). Traffic Team Officers are the only Officers that have motorcycles

-Team 8 is The Investigations Bureau. Team 8 consists of the:

 Central Investigations Division
 Auto Theft
 Crimes Against Property
 White Collar Unit
 Crimes Against Persons
 Family Violence Unit
 Special Victims Unit
 Internet Crimes Against Children (ICAC)
 Special Investigations Unit: Detectives from this division also include the Crime  Stoppers representative, career criminal tracking, and Intelligence Unit, Crime Analysis Unit, and officers assigned to liaison with federal agencies including the:
 ATF
 DEA
 FBI
 U.S. Marshals

-Team 9 is the Central Business District consists of the portion of the city that includes the Market along with Upper and Lower King Street. This Team works with the city's business services, zoning, planning and transportation departments to maintain a successful management plan for the city's growing hospitality areas.

-Team 12 consists of Community Outreach coordinators, the Housing Unit, the Community Oriented Policing Unit, and Crime Prevention.

Hiring and training 
An applicant with no prior experience or certification can expect 12 months from the time that they apply until they are finished with PTO(patrol training officer) before they are in a vehicle assigned to a team on their own. New hires have to apply online now at government jobs. The application will be received and upon receipt of the application you will receive confirmation by email for testing. The testing will start with you completing a polygraph questionnaire and then you will immediately start the physical agility test. The test consist of a one-rep bench press of at least 50% of ones body weight or the max of 66%. After you and the other candidates are finished you will be taken to a track and field to complete the sit-up portion. The 300 meter dash is after the sit up portion and then after the 300-meter sat you will complete the push up portion. The last event after the push up portion is the 1.5 mile run. The test will conclude and then you along with the other applicant will go back to the police headquarters to shower and change so that you can complete the written exam. If you pass the written exam then you will have an interview and polygraph scheduled that will usually take place the same day. If an applicant passes this phase you then go into the background phase where an investigator will look over all of your background information that you provided to verify all the information. After completing this phase you will receive an offer of temporary employment. The last step in the application phase is the psychological exam followed by a medical exam.

Individuals who accept employment with Charleston Police Department will take part in the agency's 12-week Police Corps program. Police Corps is hosted at the department's training facility, is held Monday through Friday, prepares cadets to be a leader within the organization, and to successfully complete the South Carolina Criminal Justice Academy (SCCJA). Once Police Corps is complete, individuals are sworn in as law enforcement professionals and then attend South Carolina Criminal Justice Academy's 8-week program. During this time at SCCJA, officers reside on campus Monday through Friday. Please visit the South Carolina Criminal Justice Academy website for more information. The Charleston Police Corps program is not a militarized version as seen by many departments because the department focuses on education and training.

Upon successful completion of SCCJA, officers take part in a 14-week training program with a Patrol Training Officer (PTO). Charleston Police Department has the longest training times to become a certified officer in the state as well as a 2-year probationary period. In order to be a police officer after the city of Charleston training, state academy training, patrol training officer training and probationary training an officer will spend approximately 5,600-7,000 hours of combined academy training and on the job training.

A lateral hire is considered someone who has one year of sworn law enforcement experience and a valid state law enforcement certification. The Charleston Police Department currently accepts applications for lateral hires, both in-state and out-of-state, who are interested in transitioning to their organization. If offered employment, the lateral officer would take part in an expedited process to acquire his/her South Carolina law enforcement certification and a five-week training period with a Patrol Training Officer (PTO).

Salary and benefits 
The Charleston Police Department is the highest paid municipal agency within the state. However, The South Carolina State Troopers salary for new hires is higher for those with only a high school diploma, GED and associate degree. Uniforms and equipment is provided at no cost to the employee. Salary levels are competitive and based on the results of periodic salary surveys. Salary levels are also dependent upon the officer's rank in the department. Minimum education level is that of a High School Diploma or GED.  Additional education incentive pay is 7% each for an associate degree, Bachelor's Degree, Master's degree or PHD/JD/Law Degree. The pay scale is seen as below. So let's say you have a bachelor's degree then your starting pay will be $46,851.77 and after one year it will be $49,194.37. Each year the pay will increase until you make $56,948.63. The first number is what an officer will be paid and the last number is what they will max out at. Certified Officer means that the officer comes from another agency within the state.

Certified Officer

Holidays 
You are given 10 scheduled, paid holidays per year. Vacation is accrued at a rate of 1 day per month for the first five years and increases after 5 years.

Sick leave 
Sick leave is accrued at a rate of 1 day per month.

Insurance 
Most medical, dental, vision, pharmaceutical and life insurances are paid by the employer. Family members may be added to the medical insurance program at a group rate.

Military leave 
Officers who are military reservists may receive up to fifteen days of military leave per year with pay.

References 

 CALEA Accreditation with Excellence July, 2011
 CALEA Meritorious Accreditation July, 2011

External links
 Official website

Organizations based in Charleston, South Carolina
Municipal police departments of South Carolina